Laura Hietaranta (born 2 February 2004) is a Finnish tennis player.

On the junior tour, Hietaranta has a career high junior ranking of 32, achieved on 1 March 2021.

Hietaranta has represented Finland at the Billie Jean King Cup, making her debut in 2020.

Junior career 
Junior Grand Slam results - Singles:

 Australian Open: 1R (2022)

 French Open: –

 Wimbledon: 1R (2021)

 US Open: 1R (2021)

Junior Grand Slam results - Doubles:

 Australian Open: 1R (2022)

 French Open: –

 Wimbledon: F (2021)

 US Open: 1R (2021)

ITF Finals

Singles: 3 (2 titles, 1 runner–up)

Doubles: 4 (3 titles, 1 runner-up)

Junior Grand Slam finals

Doubles: 1 (1 runner-up)

References

External links
 
 
 
 

2004 births
Living people
Finnish female tennis players
21st-century Finnish women